South African constitutional law is the area of South African law relating to the interpretation and application of the Constitution of the Republic of South Africa by the country's courts. All laws of South Africa must conform with the Constitution; any laws inconsistent with the Constitution have no force or effect.

Constitutions 

South Africa is generally considered to have had five constitutional documents since the Union was established in 1910, including the current one. The constitutions in chronological order are:

 South Africa Act 1909
 Constitution of South Africa, 1961 (also known as the "Republican Constitution")
 Constitution of South Africa, 1983 (also known as the "Tricameral Constitution")
 Constitution of South Africa, 1993 (also known as the "Interim Constitution")
 Constitution of South Africa, 1996 (also known as the "Final Constitution")

The Interim Constitution abolished South Africa's system of parliamentary sovereignty and replaced it with a dispensation wherein the Constitution is the supreme law, as opposed to the will of Parliament. The previous three constitutions were all subject to parliamentary amendment with, generally, a simple majority, therefore were not considered extraordinary statutes.

Cases 
 Billiton Aluminium SA Ltd t/a Hillside Aluminium v Khanyile and Others 2010 (5) BCLR 422 (CC).
 Dawood and Another v Minister of Home Affairs and Others; Shalabi and Another v Minister of Home Affairs and Others; Thomas and Another v Minister of Home Affairs and Others 2000 (3) SA 936 (CC).
 De Lille and Another v Speaker of the National Assembly 1998 (3) SA 430 (C).
 Fraser v Absa Bank Ltd (National Director of Public Prosecutions as Amicus Curiae) 2007 (3) SA 484 (CC).
 Khala v Minister of Safety and Security 1994 (4) SA 218 (W).
 Mistry v Interim Medical and Dental Council of South Africa and others 1998 (4) SA 1127 (CC).
 NCGLE v Minister of Justice
 Pharmaceutical Manufacturers Association of SA and Another: In Re Ex Parte President of the Republic of South Africa and Others 2000 (2) SA 674 (CC).
 Speaker of the National Assembly v De Lille and Another 1999 (4) SA 863 (SCA).
 Zealand v Minister of Justice and Constitutional Development and Another 2008 (2) SACR 1 (CC).

Notes 

 
Law of South Africa
Inheritance